Marilyn Solaya (born 6 August 1970) is a Cuban film director, actor, screenwriter, and producer.

Solaya began a career as an actor in 1993 in Fresa y chocolate.

Works

Director
 Show Room (1996)
 Alegrías (1999)
 Hasta que la muerte nos separe (2001)
 Mírame mi amor (2002)
 Retamar (2004)
 En el cuerpo equivocado (2010)
 Vestido de novia (2014)
 En busca de un espacio (2019)

Screenwriter
 Show Room (1996)
 Alegrías (1999)
 Hasta que la muerte nos separe (2001)
 Mírame mi amor (2002)
 Vestido de novia (2014)
 En busca de un espacio (2019)#

Actor
 Fresa y chocolate (1993)
 Despabílate amor (1996)
 Sensibile (1998)
 Resonancias (1998)
 Omerta III La ley del silencio (1998)

Producer
 Show Room (1996)
 Alegrías... (1999)
 En busca de un espacio (2019)

References

External links
 

Cuban artists
Living people
1970 births
Cuban film directors
Cuban actresses